Hugh Edmonds (1877 – unknown) was a Scottish footballer who played as a goalkeeper.

Career
Born in Chryston, Lanarkshire, Edmonds began his career with Hamilton Academical, where he was loaned to Celtic for a match in the one-off 1902 British League Cup, then won three Lanarkshire Cups and the 1903–04 Scottish Division Two title, before moving across the Irish Sea to Belfast in 1907 to play for Distillery. He then played for Linfield before joining English Second Division champions Bolton Wanderers in October 1909. He played four times for Bolton in the First Division in 1909–10, but the club finished bottom of the league in 20th place and were relegated. He made six more appearances in 1910–11, but spent most of the season in the reserve team.

In February 1911, he moved to Manchester United as cover for the injured Harry Moger. He made his debut in a 3–1 win at home to Bristol City on 11 February. With Edmonds in goal, Manchester United lost only two of their final 13 league matches and conceded just 12 goals as they went on to clinch their second league title by a single point over runners-up Aston Villa. He claimed his second piece of silverware with the club at the start of the following season as Manchester United beat Swindon Town 8–4 in the 1911 FA Charity Shield, and retained his place in the team for much of the 1911–12 season; aside from five appearances for Moger (one in a 3–1 win over Aston Villa on 25 November and four more at the end of the season) and two for Ezra Royals (against Liverpool on 23 March and Aston Villa on 30 March), Edmonds played in every match. However, the team suffered a slump in form compared to the previous season and finished in 13th place.

At the end of the season, he took the job of player-manager at Glenavon back in Ireland, before returning to Distillery a year later.

During his time in Ireland, Edmonds earned one cap for the Irish League XI.

References
General

Specific

External links
Profile at StretfordEnd.co.uk

1877 births
Year of death missing
Scottish footballers
Scottish football managers
Association football goalkeepers
Footballers from North Lanarkshire
Association football player-managers
Hamilton Academical F.C. players
Ashfield F.C. players
Celtic F.C. players
Lisburn Distillery F.C. players
Linfield F.C. players
Bolton Wanderers F.C. players
Manchester United F.C. players
Glenavon F.C. players
Glenavon F.C. managers
Irish League representative players
Scottish Junior Football Association players
Scottish Football League players
English Football League players
NIFL Premiership players
NIFL Premiership managers